Jervis Street  is a street on the Northside of Dublin, Ireland laid out in the 17th century and named for Sir Humphrey Jervis.

Location 
It runs from Parnell Street in the north to Ormond Quay Lower in the south. It is crossed by Mary Street, Abbey Street Upper, and Strand Street Great.

History 
The street is part of the area developed by Humphrey Jervis after 1674 and named after him. Jervis purchased a portion of the St Mary's Abbey estate in 1674, on which he developed. Jervis Street first appears on maps in 1728. He also developed Stafford Street, now Wolfe Tone Street, Capel Street and Mary Street.

A house in Jervis Street was for many years the home of the surgeon Samuel Croker-King, first president of the Royal College of Surgeons in Ireland, and his wife, the noted beauty Miss Obre.

Over 900 people were listed as living in Jervis Street in the 1911 Irish Census.

In 1913, Jervis Street was one of the streets photographed by John Cooke, Honorary Treasurer of the National Society for the Prevention of Cruelty to Children (NSPCC), for presentation to the Dublin Housing Inquiry into the conditions of housing of the working classes of Dublin.

It was once the location of the Jervis Street Hospital which has since become the Jervis Shopping Centre which opened in 1996.

See also
Mary Street, Dublin

References

External links 

Streets in Dublin (city)
Abbey Street